"I'm Not the One" is a song by the American rock band the Cars, from their fourth album, Shake It Up. It features Ric Ocasek on lead vocals, Benjamin Orr singing the 'You Know Why' phrase, with the whole group repeating "going round and round" as backing vocals throughout the song.

Overview
"I'm Not the One" first appeared in 1981 on Shake It Up. It was not a charting single at the time, but was nonetheless included on the band's 1985 Greatest Hits album. The song was remixed on the Greatest Hits album, emphasizing the drum track with added reverb. It was then released as a single in 1986, following "Tonight She Comes", also from the Greatest Hits album. "I'm Not the One" debuted on the Billboard Top 40 chart on March 8, 1986, and peaked at number 32.

AllMusic reviewer Donald A. Guarisco described "I'm Not the One" as one of Shake It Up "strongest and most memorable tunes", commenting that its sound still sounded fresh upon its 1986 re-release, five years after its first appearance on Shake It Up.  Cash Box called it a "laid back tune [that] may get new life from its single re-issue."

The song is played in a scene from the 1995 comedy film Billy Madison, where the title character (Adam Sandler) reads Valentine's Day cards in third grade. 

The song was sampled for the 2001 song "Thank You" by rapper Lil' Bow Wow.

In 2005, the album, Substitution Mass Confusion: A Tribute to The Cars, was released on Not Lame Recordings, which included a cover of "I'm Not the One" by Gigolo Aunts.

Composition
The song's intro and choruses are in the key of B minor. The intro features two synthesizer parts layered on top of each other, one derived from Ric Ocasek's vocal melody, and the other a supporting counter-melody in a softer tone. The intro/chorus begins with a chord progression of B minor, F♯ minor, E minor, and A major, but is immediately followed with a reversal, F♯ minor to B minor, retaining the E minor to A major movement. After another "reversed" repeat, the E minor to A functions as a ii-V-I turnaround in the key's relative major of D.

The official sheet music folio lists the chord progression as D, to D/C, to D/B (enharmonic to a B minor seventh chord), to D/B♭ (enharmonic to a B♭ augmented major seventh chord), and video exists of Ocasek performing the song, solo on acoustic guitar, according to this progression. However, other transcriptionists describe the chord progression as D to D/C, to G/B, or to Gm/B♭. Either way, the last chord of the verse is a G minor sixth chord, in transition to the chorus in B minor. Each verse is introduced with a guitar melody from Elliot Easton, who layers several clean-tone guitar parts over the synthesizer-dominated arrangement. There is also a horn-like synthesizer solo by Greg Hawkes, played over the chorus progression.

Charts

References

1981 songs
1986 singles
The Cars songs
Elektra Records singles
Song recordings produced by Roy Thomas Baker
Songs written by Ric Ocasek
New wave ballads